Chubb's cisticola (Cisticola chubbi) is a species of bird in the family Cisticolidae.
It is found in Cameroon, Kenya, Uganda and the Albertine Rift montane forests.

There are four subspecies:
 C. c. adametzi Reichenow, 1910 – southeastern Nigeria and southwestern Cameroon
 C. c. discolor Sjöstedt, 1893 – Mount Cameroon  (southwest Cameroon)  – brown-backed cisticola
 C. c. chubbi Sharpe, 1892 – eastern DR Congo to western Kenya
 C. c. marungensis Chapin, 1932 – Marungu highlands  (southeastern DR Congo)

References

Chubb's cisticola
Birds of Sub-Saharan Africa
Chubb's cisticola
Taxonomy articles created by Polbot